Herbert Hal Reynolds (March 20, 1930 – May 25, 2007) was an American academic administrator who worked as the president of Baylor University from 1981 to 1995.

Early life and education
Reynolds was born March 20, 1930, in Frankston, Texas. He graduated from Trinity University in 1952 and received an M.A. in psychology from Baylor University in 1958, followed by a PhD in 1961.

Career 
From 1952 to 1956, Reynolds served in the United States Air Force and was an advisor for the Japan Air Self-Defense Force.

From 1956 to 1959, he was an assistant professor at Baylor, and from 1958 to 1961 he was a teaching fellow. In 1961, he became deputy commander and director of research at Aeromedical Research Laboratories in Alamogordo, New Mexico, where he worked on Project Mercury, Project Gemini and Project Apollo. He also worked as an adjunct professor at Baylor and the University of New Mexico. He served as commander and director of plans at the Air Force Human Resources Laboratory in 1968.

In 1969, he became executive vice-president of Baylor University. From 1981 to 1995, he served as its president. Under his leadership, Baylor University expanded significantly, added women's sports programs, and joined the Big Twelve Conference. He also moved to limit the Baptist General Convention of Texas control of the university by changing the university's charter in 1990. He served as its chancellor from 1995 to 2000. From 1994 to 1997, he was a visiting scholar at Wolfson College, Cambridge.

He served as chairman of the National Association of Independent Colleges and Universities and the Independent Colleges and Universities of Texas. From 1995, he was chair of the Texas Commission on Judicial Efficiency and a member of the Texas Select Committee on Higher Education. He was also a trustee of the Baylor College of Medicine, a director of Community Bank and Trust of Waco, and a deacon and former deacon chairman of the First Baptist Church of Waco. He was a 33rd degree Mason.

Personal life 
Reynolds and his wife, Joy, married in 1950 and had three children, including director and screenwriter Kevin Reynolds. He died in May 2007. Joy died in April 2022.

References

1930 births
2007 deaths
People from Anderson County, Texas
Baptists from Texas
Baylor University faculty
University of New Mexico faculty
Fellows of Wolfson College, Cambridge
Presidents of Baylor University
20th-century Baptists
20th-century American academics